Santa Maria della Stella (or Stella Maris) is a Catholic parish church located along the Trunk Road (Strada Statale 187), in the seaside resort of Alcamo Marina, in the province of Trapani.

History
The construction of this religious building was financed in 1965 by the Pontificia Commissione centrale per l'arte sacra in Italia (the Pontifical Commission for Sacred Art in Italy) and the Ministry of Public Works. It was restored in 2007 and is run by the Salesians of Alcamo; it is at the service of the believers living at Alcamo Marina.

Description
The Church, in the middle of Alcamo Marina, has a central body with a circular ground plan, accessible through a portal which is surmounted by a mosaic representing Santa Maria della Stella.
Between 2005 and 2007 they made a large restoration work; the planners were the engineers Michelangelo Mangiapane and Giuseppe Di Natale; the interior works were planned by Vincenzo Settipani, an architect.

They realized the sacristy, the parish office, the adaptation of bathrooms and small-scale electrical installations, the restoration of external parts, including the façade which was deteriorated due to the proximity of sea. 
As the building is mostly used in summer, they provided it with air conditioning systems..
Finally, they did the internal and external paving with granite, with a star in black granite and yellow Australian one, and some triangles made with pink granite and white marble on either side of the star.

References

Sources

Other projects

See also
Alcamo
Alcamo Marina
Salesians of Don Bosco

Roman Catholic churches in Alcamo
Baroque church buildings in Sicily